Aaron Goulding (born 29 April 1982 in Adelaide, South Australia, Australia) is an Australian footballer who last played for Parafield Gardens.

Club career
In 2005, he played for Adelaide United in the A-League, having previously played for Adelaide City in the National Soccer League.

In 2007, after being released from Adelaide United he signed for local club Para Hills Knights.

National honours
 FIFA U-17 World Championship: 1999 (runners-up)
 Under 20
 Under 23

References

1982 births
Living people
Soccer players from Adelaide
Association football fullbacks
Australian soccer players
A-League Men players
FFSA Super League players
National Soccer League (Australia) players
Adelaide City FC players
Adelaide United FC players
Para Hills Knights players